Jack Conley was an American football, basketball, and baseball coach. He served as the head football coach at Wheaton College in Wheaton, Illinois for three seasons, from 1922 to 1924, compiling a record of 8–11–2.

Head coaching record

Football

References

Year of birth missing
Place of birth missing
Year of death missing
Wheaton Thunder baseball coaches
Wheaton Thunder football coaches
Wheaton Thunder men's basketball coaches